Rocket is an album by Edie Brickell & New Bohemians. The album was released on October 12, 2018, and is their first album since 2006's Stranger Things. The band wrote the songs on the album during the rehearsals of their 2017 La Rondalla Benefit Concert. After that they decided to record them, and the band recorded seven songs in eight days. The lead singer of the band, Edie Brickell, says that the album doesn't have too much structure, and often bounces between genres. Brickell also hopes that this album is a new beginning for the band and will bring them back on the radar.

Singles 
"What Makes You Happy" was released as the first single on September 13, 2018 along with a music video to accompany it. The second single, "Tell Me" was released on September 27, 2018.

Track listing

Personnel 
 Edie Brickell – vocals, electric guitar (6), acoustic guitar (13)
 Kyle Crusham – Hammond B3 organ (1), Roland Juno-106 (2), wind controller (2), Prophet-6 (3), Moog bass (3), ARP synthesizer (6, 8), acoustic guitar (6), acoustic piano (8),  Mellotron (8, 13), baritone guitar (8), treatments (12)
 Matt Hubbard – organ (1, 4, 7, 12), Prophet-6 (1, 9), backing vocals (1), Hammond B3 organ (2, 5, 8, 9, 10), Wurlitzer electric piano (2, 3, 8, 9), acoustic piano (3, 4, 7, 10, 11), Roland Juno-106 (3), Mellotron (3, 9, 11), Moog synthesizer (3, 5), synthesizers (4, 12), vibraphone (11)
 Dave Monsey – acoustic piano (6), Rhodes piano (6), Hammond B3 organ (6), bass guitar (6, 13)
 Jordan Knull – Moog synthesizer (12)
 Dave Palmer – acoustic piano (13)
 Kenny Withrow – electric guitars (1-6, 8-11, 13), bass guitar (1), backing vocals (1, 5), acoustic guitar (2, 4, 5, 11), guitars (7, 12), 12-string acoustic guitar (10)
 Brad Houser – Moog bass (1), backing vocals (1), bass guitar (2-5, 7, 8, 9, 11, 12), Moog synthesizer (8), electric upright bass (10), saxophone (12)
 Brandon Aly – drums (1-5, 7-12), backing vocals (1)
 Matt Chamberlain – drums (6), percussion (6)
 Aaron Comess – drums (13)
 John Bush – percussion (1-5, 7-12), backing vocals (1, 8), drums (2), Roland Juno-106 (8)
 Todd Crusham – toy bells (12)
 Alice Spencer – backing vocals (1, 9)
 Lulu Simon – backing vocals (3)
 Hunter Hendrickson – backing vocals (7)

Production 
 Kyle Crusham – producer, engineer, mixing (1-5, 7-13)
 Dave Monsey – co-producer (6)
 Charlie Sexton – producer (13)
 Tchad Blake – mixing (6)
 Natalie Weber – A&R 
 Melody Ewing – A&R administration 
 Femi Onafowokan – A&R administration
 Rafaela Hernández – production manager 
 Julie Johantgen – release coordinator 
 Chad Evans – packaging, artwork 
 Jacob Lerman – design
 Todd Crusham – photography 
 Jeff Kramer – management 
 Cindy Osborne – management

References 

Edie Brickell & New Bohemians albums
2018 albums